The Journal of Pediatric Endocrinology and Metabolism is a peer-reviewed medical journal covering pediatric endocrinology and published by Walter de Gruyter. The editor-in-chief is Zvi Zadik (Hebrew University of Jerusalem).

References 
 

Pediatrics journals
Endocrinology journals
De Gruyter academic journals
Monthly journals
English-language journals
Publications established in 1985